Ignacio Galindo (born 1 March 1959), best known by his stage name Nacho Galindo, is a Mexican Christian singer best known as the lead vocalist of the Regional Mexican band Conjunto Primavera.

History 
In 1976, at the age of 17, Nacho Galindo joined Conjunto Primavera with his brother Gustavo Galindo, his cousin Adan Huerta, Juan Dominguez, Ramiro Rodriguez and Telesforo Saenz. He spent 12 years with the band during which time they released 11 albums. On 28 June 1986 he attended a Christian service, in which he "accepted Jesus into his heart". On 19 March 1989 he left the band telling them that "God had called him", since his life was complicated while in the band because of drugs and alcohol. From then, he finished his career in the music industry.

Ministry 
In 1991, he decided to start recording music again, with the difference that he wrote Christian lyrics, and that his music was only to influence people in a positive way. He now sings, and testifies only about God.

Albums 
"A Donde Vas"
"Al Desalentado"
"Amor Incomparable"
"En La Batalla"
"Grupo Azareel"
"Himnos Tradicionales"
"Las Pruebas"
"Lo Que Dios Unio"
"Mi Anhelo"
"Mi Clamor"
"Volvera"
"Vino A liberarme"

References 

Living people
1959 births
Mexican male singer-songwriters
Mexican singer-songwriters
People from Chihuahua (state)